Convoy SC 100 was the 100th of the numbered series of World War II Slow Convoys of merchant ships from Sydney, Cape Breton Island to Liverpool. The convoy departed Halifax on 12 September 1942 and was joined on 16 September by Mid-Ocean Escort Force Group A-3. The convoy had been scattered by an equinoctial storm when U-boats found it on 18 September. The ships of Group A-3 were not fast enough to catch surfaced U-boats; and the U-boats sank five scattered ships before losing contact on 25 September. Surviving ships reached Liverpool on 28 September.

Escorts
The convoy was escorted by the following allied warships:-

 13 Flower-class corvettes 
 2 destroyers
 Grom-class destroyer ORP Błyskawica, and Town-class destroyer HMCS Niagara
 1 Grimsby-class sloop
 
 2 ASW Trawlers
 HMT Kingston Beryl
 HMT Narvik
 1 River-class frigate 
 
 2 Treasury-class cutters
 ,

U-boats
The convoy was attacked by both Wolfpack Lohs comprising 9 U-boats, and 8 U-boats from Wolfpack Pfeil, namely

Wolfpack Lohs
  – Kapitänleutnant Friedrich-Hermann Praetorius
  – Kapitänleutnant Reiner Dierksen
  – Kapitänleutnant Klaus Köpke
  – Kapitänleutnant Paul-Karl Loeser
  – Kapitänleutnant Kurt Sturm
  – Kapitänleutnant Heinz-Otto Schultze
  – Kapitänleutnant Hans-Peter Hinsch
  – Kapitänleutnant Wolfgang Breithaupt
  – Kapitänleutnant Walter Göing

Wolfpack Pfeil
  – Kapitänleutnant Karl-Otto Schultz
  – Kapitänleutnant Hans-Hartwig Trojer
  – Kapitänleutnant Wilhelm von Mässenhausen
  – Kapitänleutnant Georg Wallas
  – Kapitänleutnant Jürgen Quaet-Faslem
  – Kapitänleutnant Ernst Mengersen
  – Kapitänleutnant Ralph Kapitzky
  – Kapitänleutnant Albrecht Brandi

Order of battle

Allied merchant ships

Convoy escorts

References

Bibliography
 
 
 Willoughby, Malcolm F. The U.S. Coast Guard in World War II (1957) United States Naval Institute

SC100
Naval battles of World War II involving Canada
C